Asiasoft is an online game operator in Thailand, Vietnam, Indonesia, Philippines, Singapore and Malaysia.  Its headquarters is located in Bangkok, Thailand. Asiasoft's services are primarily operated within Southeast Asia.

Asiasoft was founded in Thailand in 2001 with the primary objective of providing games and promoting online content in Thailand. Asiasoft's core business covers the publishing of online massive multiplayer games and multiplayer online games, co-publishing and development of new products.

Asiasoft works very closely with game operators and developers located in Bangkok, Thailand. Asiasoft's support also has presence in Singapore, Malaysia, Vietnam, Indonesia, and Philippines. The Asiasoft Group currently consists of 600 employees.

AsiaSoft Online is 100% subsidiary of AsiaSoft Corporation Co. Ltd of publishing companies with a presence in Singapore, Malaysia, Thailand and Vietnam serving over 15 million gamers.

AsiaSoft Online's network and distribution channels in Singapore and Malaysia span over 1000 retail outlets which include PC Bunk, 7-Eleven outlets, popular bookstores, Comic Connection stores, convenience stores, cybercafes and SAM machines.

MapleStorySEA has broken numerous performance records including an online community that was awarded Singapore's most popular website in the gaming category.

Asiasoft Online has also organized over 35 real-life game events for their players such as the MapleStorySEA Birthday Bash, PangyaSEA Fiesta and AuditionSEA Hari Raya Puasa Celebration. Players must verify their AsiaSoft Passports with their National IDs in order to participate in most of the real life events and parties.

Company divisions

Asiasoft Corporation PCL. (Thailand)
Asiasoft was first founded in 2001 in Thailand, but services extended to encompass most of South East Asia. Asiasoft published Asian games and multiplayer online games, and co-published and developed of new products. In March 2003 Asiasoft published its first two games, Ragnarok Online from Gravity and Dragon Raja Online from eSofnet. In 2004, two more new games were published and co-published: Gunbound from Softnyx and TS Online, and in late 2005, MapleStory from Wizet.

Asiasoft Co. Ltd (Vietnam)
Asiasoft Co. Ltd(Vietnam) was formed in 2001 in Vietnam to manage gaming services provided in Vietnam. Asiasoft was the first publishing game company to be established in Vietnam. Asiasoft Vietnam published Asian games and multiplayer online games, and co-published and developed of new products. The first published game from Asiasoft was Gunbound from Softnyx. Later in the year Asiasoft also published TS Online from Chinese Gamers of Taiwan.

Trilight Cove Enterprises Ltd (Indochina)
Trilight Cove Enterprises Ltd was formed in 2001 to manage Asiasoft subsidiaries in Vietnam, Cambodia, and Burma.

Asiasoft Online Pte. Ltd. (Singapore)
Asiasoft Online Pte. Ltd. (Singapore) was formed in 2004 to publish and manage games MMORPGs (massively multiplayer online role-playing games) in Singapore and Malaysia. Playpark Pte. Ltd. has published MapleStory, PangYa, KongKong Online, Audition Online, GetAmped, Darkness and Light and Grand Chase. It is also the official and sole distributor for Blizzard Entertainment's World of Warcraft products in Singapore. Playpark Pte. Ltd. has teamed up with SilkRoad Online, Gunbound, MU Online and Shot Online to allow players to purchase A-Cash before redeeming it for the respective games' cash points. It has since been merged with several Asiasoft subsidiaries to form PlayPark Pte Ltd.

Asiasoft Online Sdn. Bhd. (Malaysia)
Asiasoft Online was formed in 2004, to publish and manage game services in Malaysia, it also works with Asiasoft Online Pte. Ltd(Singapore) to co-manage English server games. It has since been restructured and rebranded, operating under the new name CIB Development Sdn Bhd.

PlayPark Pte Ltd 
As part of restructuring, PlayPark Pte Ltd was formed to oversee all game managing divisions of Asiasoft International Company Limited, merging several Asiasoft subsidiaries under one company.

PT. Asiasoft (Indonesia)
PT. Asiasoft was founded 2011 in Indonesia and has published three games for PC:

 AIKA Online (terminated 2014)
 AVA (terminated 2014)
 Brawl Buster (terminated 2013)

PT. Asiasoft has expanded on mobile games platform (regional) and currently four titles are running:

 Advance Dino
 Heart Castle
 Line Dragonica Mobile
 Playpark Dragon Encounter

Playpark Inc. - former name Level Up! Inc. (Philippines) 

Asiasoft Corporation Public Company Limited reported that it would acquire 70% of the Philippines-based company Level Up! Inc. for $2.9 million on February 5, 2014, acquisition was completed in the same year. Its portfolio is now published under Asiasoft's website.

Asiasoft Passport

Players are required to sign up for Asiasoft Passports in order to play any of the company's published games. Like Gamania(requires ID Card(Taiwan)) and Nexon Korea(requires RRN), it also required an identity document number(known in Singapore as NRIC, and in Malaysia as MyKad) to sign up. That requirement was dropped in 2008. In 2019, with the departure of its final game, MapleStorySEA, to a new login service named MapleStorySEA Passport, Asiasoft Passport services has officially been discontinued.

PlayPark ID

In 2011, Asiasoft introduced the concept of PlayPark accounts, advertised by Asiasoft as a one stop service for players to managed their Asiasoft published games' accounts with only one set of login credentials, this service was only offered to new games released since PlayPark ID services started, older active titles such as MapleStorySEA, and AudtionSEA were still accessed via Asiasoft Passport.

Currently Thailand, Singapore, Malaysia, Vietnam, Indonesia and the Philippines have implemented the Playpark system. In January 2022, PlayPark changed its logo and announced its plans to incorporate blockchain technology and NFT into the games.

Published games

Asiasoft Corporation PCL. (Thailand)

Asiasoft Online (Southeast Asia*)

(*) Joining Asiasoft Online Pte Ltd and AS Online Sdn Bhd. Country is Thailand, Vietnam, Indonesia, Philippines, Singapore, Malaysia, Cambodia, and Burma

Playpark Pte. Ltd. (Singapore) & CIB Development Sdn. Bhd. (Malaysia)

Asiasoft Co. Ltd (Vietnam)

PT. Asiasoft (Indonesia)

Playpark Inc. (Philippines)

Trilight Cove Enterprises Ltd (Indochina*)

(*) Country is Vietnam, Cambodia, and Burma.

See also
Gamania
Nexon
UserJoy Technology

References

External links
Asiasoft
 Asiasoft Corporation Co. Ltd
 Asiasoft Co. Ltd
 Playpark Thailand
Playpark Vietnam
Playpark Forums Vietnam
Asiasoft SEA
Playpark SEA
Relates Asiasoft
Asiasoft Forums SEA
Playpark Forums SEA
The Board Resolution for the Restructuration of subsidiary companies of Asiasoft Corporation Public Company Limited

Video game development companies
Video game companies of Thailand
Video game publishers
Companies listed on the Stock Exchange of Thailand